Chhatrapur railway station is one of two railway stations in Chatrapur, this being the main railway station in Ganjam district, Odisha. Its code is CAP . It serves Chhatrapur city and another one is Chatrapur Court halt, which code is CAPC. It is situated in the heart of the town, where only DMU, EMU, and passenger trains are stopping.

Infrastructure 
The main station consists of four platforms. There is a pedestrian bridge, the only one in Odisha, which installed by the Eco railway. For the passengers to stay in retiring room, the dormitory facility also available, which one can opt to book through IRCTC web portal. Outside of the station there is a SBI ATM.

Court station only having two platforms.

Line 
The station is situated on the East Coast railway line which is a major route connecting the two metros Kolkata and Chennai of India.

Trains 

 Konark Express
 Bhubaneswar–Tirupati Superfast Express
 Visakhapatnam–Tatanagar Superfast Express
 Bhubaneswar–Brahmapur Passenger
 Visakha Express
 East Coast Express
 Bhubaneswar–Tirupati Superfast Express
 Tirupati–Bhubaneswar Superfast Express
 Santragachi–Chennai Central Antyodaya Express
 Bhubaneswar–Palasa Passenger
 Hirakhand Express
 Puri–Gandhidham Weekly Superfast Express (via Vizianagaram)
 Visakha Express
 Howrah–Chennai Central Mail
 Puri–Okha Dwarka Express
 Konark Express
 Khurda Road–Brahmapur MEMU Special
 Puri–Tirupati Express
 Bhubaneswar–Visakhapatnam Intercity Superfast Express
 Cuttack–Brahmapur MEMU
 Cuttack–Brahmapur Fast Passenger
 Okha–Puri Dwarka Express
 Brahmapur – Bhubaneswar Passenger
 Prasanti Express
 Chennai Central–Santragachi Antyodaya Express
 Puri-Chennai Central Weekly Superfast Express
 East Coast Express
 Yesvantpur–Puri Weekly Garib Rath Express
 Junagarh Road–Bhubaneswar Express (Hirakhand Link)
 Palasa–Bhubaneswar Passenger
 Brahmapur–Khurda Road MEMU Special
 Bhubaneswar–Junagarh Road Link Express (Hirakhand Link)
 Ahmedabad–Puri SF Express (via Brahmapur)
 Puri–Yesvantpur Weekly Garib Rath Express
 Gunupur–Rourkela Rajya Rani Express
 Gandhidham–Puri Weekly Superfast Express (via Vizianagaram)
 Cuttack–Palasa Passenger
 Visakhapatnam–Paradeep Superfast Express
 Hirakhand Express
 Palasa–Cuttack Passenger
 Paradeep–Vishakapatnam Superfast Express
 Gunupur–Puri Passenger
 Hirakud (Hirakund) Express
 Brahmapur–Cuttack MEMU
 Visakhapatnam–Bhubaneswar Superfast InterCity Express
 Tirupati–Bhubaneswar Superfast Express
 Prasanti Express
 Rourkela–Gunupur Rajya Rani Express
 Puri–Gunupur Passenger
 Chennai Central–Howrah Mail
 Puri–Ahmedabad Superfast Express (via Brahmapur)
 Brahmapur–Cuttack Fast Passenger
 Tirupati–Puri Express
 Tatanagar–Visakhapatnam Weekly Superfast Express
 Hirakud (Hirakund) Express
 Chennai Central–Puri Weekly Superfast Express

References

External links

Railway stations in Ganjam district
Khurda Road railway division